Tekom Municipality is a municipality in the Mexican state of Yucatán. Tekom is also the name of the municipality's largest settlement and seat of the municipal government (cabecera municipal). In the XII national census (Censo General de Población y Vivienda) conducted by INEGI in 2000, Tekom municipality recorded a population of 2,660 inhabitants. In the intermediate census count undertaken by INEGI in 2005 (the II Conteo de Población y Vivienda), the total municipal population was recorded as 2,933 inhabitants, 2,413 of whom spoke one of the recognised indigenous languages of Mexico (Yucatec Maya).

As with most of the Yucatán Peninsula there are no surface rivers or creeks, but there are subterranean water-filled sinkholes (cenotes) some of which are naturally exposed at the surface. The climate is classed as subhumid.

Tekom was created as a municipio libre of Yucatán state on 1 January 1920. In 1957 the southern half of Tekom's territory was partitioned off to form a new municipality, Chikindzonot.

References

Further reading

External links
 H. Ayuntamiento de Tekom, website of Tekom's municipal government 

Municipalities of Yucatán